In the United Kingdom, a simplified IVA (SIVA) was a proposed new form of IVA (individual voluntary arrangement), which would have been a formal alternative of clearing debt without being declared bankrupt.

The new regime was likely to have been two tiers:
Tier 1 would have had an upper limit of £25–30,000, and 
Tier 2 an upper limit of £75,000.

Also, the approval of an SIVA was likely to have been based on a simple majority instead of the existing 75%.

The government decided not to proceed with the proposals for SIVA in November 2008.

Simplified IVA plans withdrawn
In December 2008 The plans announced to modify the Insolvency Act 1986 by introducing SIVAs (Simplified IVA) have been withdrawn from the regulatory marketplace.  The association said that the "successful operation of the IVA (Individual Voluntary Arrangement) Protocol has resulted in many of the desired improvements in the IVA marketplace being implemented without the need for further insolvency legislation".

See also
Individual voluntary arrangement
Company voluntary arrangement

External links
UK Government Simplified IVA Proposals
Simplified Advice With IVAs

Insolvency law of the United Kingdom